Mithqāl is a unit of mass equal to  which is mostly used for measuring precious metals, such as gold, and other commodities, like saffron.

The name was also applied as an alternative term for the gold dinar, a coin that was used throughout much of the Islamic world from the 8th century onward and survived in parts of Africa until the 19th century.  The name of Mozambique's currency since 1980, the metical, is derived from mithqāl.

Etymology
The word mithqāl (“weight, unit of weight”) comes from the Arabic thaqala, meaning “to weigh”. Other variants of the unit in English include miskal (from Persian or Urdu ; misqāl), mithkal, mitkal and mitqal.

Indian mithqaal 
In India, the measurement is known as mithqaal. It contains 4  and 3½  (rata'ii; مثقال).

It is equivalent to 4.25 grams when measuring gold, or 4.5 grams when measuring commodities. It may be more or less than this.

Conversion factors

The mithqāl in another more modern calculation is as follows:

Nakhud is a Baháʼí unit of mass used by Bahá'u'lláh. The mithqāl had originally consisted of 24 nakhuds, but in the Bayán, the collective works of the Báb, this was reduced to 19.

See also
 Troy ounce
 Gram
 Gold gram
 Nisab
 Mithqal Al Fayez

References

Units of mass
Measurement
Ottoman units of measurement
Islamic banking
Arabic words and phrases
Islamic banking and finance terminology